Asaichandpur, also known as Ashiya Chand Pur and previously known as Alipur, is a village in Zamania Tehsil in the Ghazipur District of Uttar Pradesh, India. The land where Asaichandpur is located was owned by the descendants of Mahmud Khan of Rasulpur, the eldest son of Daud Khan. Asaichandpurn was once a small settlement of farmers. The village's population increased to more than 1,200 by 2011.

Historical population

References

Villages in Ghazipur district